The Political Animal Lobby is a British animal welfare organisation with offices in London. It was started in 1990 by Brian Davies, an animal welfare campaigner. It lobbies public representatives and governments to improve legislation relating to animal welfare.

It is a member of Team Badger, an initiative to stop the organised killing of badgers in Gloucestershire.

In the run-up to the 1997 general election it donated £1 million to the British Labour Party. It was suggested that this was tantamount to a bribe, but George Howarth, the then Parliamentary Under-Secretary of State for the Home Office, denied that there was any connection between the donation and the Labour introduction of the Hunting Act of 2004.

In 2002 a parliamentary motion was tabled congratulating Sky News for a report on activities of the group in opposing the illegal trade in dogs for human consumption in the Philippines.

In 2019 the group criticised the decision of the Botswana government to re-introduce elephant hunting.

See also 
 International Fund for Animal Welfare
 Seal hunting
 Network for Animals

References 

Animal welfare organizations
Non-profit organisations based in the United Kingdom